The Republican River Pegram Truss is a bridge located near Concordia, Kansas that is listed on the National Register of Historic Places.  It is a three-span through truss bridge over the Republican River on route 795, northeast of Concordia.  The bridge was built in 1893 by the Edge Moor Bridge Works of Wilmington, Delaware.

This bridge, originally erected as a railroad bridge, consists of a Pegram truss span between two triple-intersection Warren (lattice) truss spans. It is the only Pegram truss bridge used to carry automobile traffic in Kansas.

See also
 National Register of Historic Places listings in Cloud County, Kansas

References

External links
 Historic Bridges of the US(with photos) 
 National Register listing
 Cloud County Road and Bridge Department

Railroad bridges in Kansas
Buildings and structures in Cloud County, Kansas
Bridges completed in 1893
Road bridges on the National Register of Historic Places in Kansas
Tourist attractions in Cloud County, Kansas
National Register of Historic Places in Cloud County, Kansas
Railroad bridges on the National Register of Historic Places in Kansas
Lattice truss bridges in the United States
Warren truss bridges in the United States